Still Breathing may refer to:

 Still Breathing (band), an American Christian metal band from Oklahoma City, Oklahoma, USA
 Still Breathing (film), a 1997 drama feature film starring Brendan Fraser and Joanna Going
 "Still Breathing" (Green Day song), a 2016 song by American rock band Green Day
 "Still Breathing" (Mayday Parade song), a 2009 song by American rock band Mayday Parade
 "Still Breathing" (Samanta Tīna song), a 2020 song by Latvian singer Samanta Tīna